The 1937 Lafayette Leopards football team was an American football team that represented Lafayette College in the Middle Three Conference during the 1937 college football season. In its first season under head coach Edward Mylin, the team compiled an 8–0 record. Edward Kanzler was the team captain.

Schedule

References

Lafayette
Lafayette Leopards football seasons
Lafayette Leopards football